Pennsylvania has the twenty-fourth highest per capita income in the United States of America, at $20,880 (2000). Its personal per capita income is $31,998 (2003), the sixteenth highest in the country.  Its median household income is $40,106 (2000), ranked twenty-eighth in the country, and its median family income is $49,184 (2000), the twenty-sixth highest in the country.  The median value of an owner-occupied housing unit is $97,000 (2000), ranked thirty-fourth in the country.

Many of the top richest places in Pennsylvania are suburbs of Pittsburgh, located in Allegheny County, and the suburbs of Harrisburg, which include Cumberland and Dauphin counties.  However, the overall richest area is the Delaware Valley, which is composed of suburban Philadelphia, and is located in a wealth corridor that runs from the suburbs of Washington, DC all the way into southern New Hampshire.  In contrast to the Delaware Valley, the wealthy Pittsburgh neighborhoods are more condensed into small locations, while the wealthy Philadelphia communities spread out over four counties (Bucks, Chester, Delaware, and Montgomery) and within the city's borders.

One notable wealthy area in the Philadelphia area is the Philadelphia Main Line, which includes Lower Merion, Radnor, Tredyffrin, Easttown, and Willistown townships.  Some of Pennsylvania's most affluent neighborhoods and priciest real estate are located in communities located in these townships, including Ardmore, Bala Cynwyd, Gladwyne, Haverford, and Villanova.  Chestnut Hill is another wealthy area, however no census data exists for it (except for zip code data), because it is part of Philadelphia.  The Northeast wealth corridor also runs through Montgomery County, highest in the area of Whitpain, Lower Gwynedd, Plymouth, Upper Dublin and Whitemarsh townships; and into areas of Bucks County especially the area around New Hope, such as Solebury, Lower Makefield, and Upper Makefield townships.

Outside of the Philadelphia, Pittsburgh, and Harrisburg metropolitan areas, Pennsylvania is a relatively poorer state, especially in the northern areas and the Appalachian Mountains; only 22% of Pennsylvania places have per capita incomes higher than the national per capita income, and 11.0% of the population lives below the poverty line.

1.9% of Pennsylvania households have annual incomes of $200,000+, and 10.3% have incomes of $100,000 or more.  On the contrary, 9.7% have incomes of less than $10,000, and 43.8% less than $34,999.

Pennsylvania counties ranked by per capita income

Note: Data is from the 2010 United States Census Data and the 2006-2010 American Community Survey 5-Year Estimates.

See also
 Pennsylvania

References

Sources
 U.S.Gov't Census Bureau Table P82 - Per Capita Income 

income
 
 
Income
Pennsylvania counties by per capita income